Qarah Bulagh (also Romanized as Qarah Būlāgh; also known as Kara-Bulag, Qarabulāq, Qarah Bolāgh, and Qareh Bolāgh) is a village in Zanjanrud-e Bala Rural District, in the Central District of Zanjan County, Zanjan Province, Iran. At the 2006 census, its population was 176, in 37 families.

References 

Populated places in Zanjan County